Shastar Vidya, also known as Sanatan Shastar Vidya,  is a centuries-old Indian battlefield art which translates to "the science of weapons".

History 

The battle art has existed in the subcontinent for thousands of years and been preserved by people from many different cultures and religions.  Since the mid-16th century, the Sikh tribes of the Punjab became the chief custodians and masters of this fighting system.  In North India it is believed that this art is the father of all martial arts.

After the Anglo-Sikh wars the art was banned by the new British administrators of India in the mid-19th century.

Features 
The basis of Shastar Vidiya is a five-step movement which includes advancing on the opponent; hitting his flank, deflection of incoming blows, taking a commanding position and striking. As a full combat martial art it also includes both unarmed and armed combat techniques using swords, clubs, sticks, spears, daggers and other weapons.

Principle of power
Shastar Vidya is a subtle art and does not rely on fitness, flexibility or strength like western fighting systems. Instead, it uses tactical positioning and body mechanics.

See also 

 Nihang

References

External links
Shastar Vidya

Indian martial arts
Pakistani martial arts
Cultural heritage of India
Indian culture
Combat sports
Rajput culture
Punjabi culture
Punjabi words and phrases
Nihang